The Brindabella Christian College (BCC) is a Private non-denominational Christian co-educational early learning, primary and secondary day school, located in the Canberra suburbs of Charnwood and Lyneham, in the Australian Capital Territory, Australia.

Established in 1980 as O’Connor Christian School, the school delivers a religious and general education for children from early learning, to Kindergarten through to Year 12.

See also

 List of schools in the Australian Capital Territory

References

External links
 Brindabella Christian College
 

Private primary schools in the Australian Capital Territory
Private secondary schools in the Australian Capital Territory
Nondenominational Christian schools in the Australian Capital Territory
Educational institutions established in 1980
1980 establishments in Australia